The Paraguay–Uruguay Sign Language family is a possible language family of two related sign languages: Paraguay Sign Language and Uruguay Sign Language.

Glottolog also includes the Chilean Sign Language in a possible larger Chile–Paraguay–Uruguay Sign family.

References 

Sign languages
Sign language families